AMPV may refer to:
 Armored Multi-Purpose Vehicle, United States Army replacement for the M113 based on the Bradley Fighting Vehicle
 Armoured Multi-Purpose Vehicle, German military vehicle